Gossage is a family of soapmakers and may also refer to:

 Goose Gossage, American Major League baseball player
 Beverly Gossage, Arkansas politician
 Howard Gossage, advertiser in San Francisco
 Leslie Gossage, officer in the British Army and RAF
 William Gossage, established the Gossage soap company
 Gene Gossage, American and Canadian footballer
 Gossage Cup, previous name of the African football tournament now called the CECAFA Cup